Aequorivita sublithincola  is a bacterium from the genus of Aequorivita which has been isolated from a quartz stone from the Antarctica.

References

Further reading

External links
Type strain of Aequorivita sublithincola at BacDive -  the Bacterial Diversity Metadatabase

Flavobacteria
Bacteria described in 2002